Raymond J. Bishop (January 15, 1906 – February 19, 1978) was a Catholic priest. He became one of the several priests involved in the case of exorcising a boy in Maryland, who allegedly was possessed after using a Ouija board. The case inspired author William Peter Blatty to write his 1971 novel The Exorcist.

Life
In 1949, Father Bishop taught at St. Louis University, where one of his female students asked for help concerning her 13-year-old cousin (for reasons of anonymity referred to by the pseudonym Robbie Mannheim), who she said had been experiencing supernatural attacks after playing with a Ouija board and had gone through one unsuccessful exorcism. Bishop contacted his close friend, Father William S. Bowdern, and they performed another exorcism on the boy.

In the 1950s, Bishop was sent to Creighton University in Omaha, Nebraska, where he taught for more than 20 years. He died on February 19, 1978, in Nebraska.

References

1906 births
1978 deaths
Catholic exorcists
Saint Louis University faculty
Creighton University faculty
20th-century American Roman Catholic priests
American exorcists